William Joseph Haboush (born 1942) is an American mathematician at the University of Illinois Urbana-Champaign who is best known for his 1975 proof of one of David Mumford's conjectures, known as Haboush's theorem.

References

20th-century American mathematicians
21st-century American mathematicians
Living people
1942 births
Date of birth missing (living people)
Place of birth missing (living people)
University of Illinois Urbana-Champaign faculty
Columbia University alumni